Wu Kai Sha is one of the 41 constituencies in the Sha Tin District in Hong Kong.

The constituency returns one district councillor to the Sha Tin District Council, with an election every four years.

Wu Kai Sha constituency is loosely based on part of the Villa Athena, Lake Silver, Double Cove and Wu Kai Sha Village in Wu Kai Sha with an estimated population of 20,592.

Councillors represented

Election results

2010s

References

Ma On Shan
Wu Kai Sha
Constituencies of Hong Kong
Constituencies of Sha Tin District Council
2015 establishments in Hong Kong
Constituencies established in 2015